= Iskhaq Yosip =

Iraqi Assyrian bishop

Religious life
- Religion: Assyrian Church of the East

Iskhaq Yosip is the Assyrian Church Bishop of Northern Iraq and Russia.

== See also ==
- Assyrian Church of the East
- Assyrian Church of the East's Holy Synod
